Roberto Guadalupe Martínez (born 21 February 1973, in San Miguel, El Salvador) is a retired Salvadoran footballer.

Club career
Nicknamed Catalnica, Martínez started his career at lower league side Espana and Liberal before making his debut in the Primera División de Fútbol de El Salvador with Águila in 1996. He also played for Alianza and Once Municipal.

International career
Martínez made his debut for El Salvador in a June 1997 World Cup qualification match against Mexico and has earned a total of 19 caps, scoring 2 goals. He has represented his country in over 7 World Cup qualification matches.

His final international game was a July 2000 World Cup qualification match against Honduras.

International goals
Scores and results list El Salvador's goal tally first.

References

External links

Martínez la figura - La Prensa Gráfica 

1973 births
Living people
People from San Miguel, El Salvador
Association football defenders
Salvadoran footballers
El Salvador international footballers
C.D. Águila footballers
Alianza F.C. footballers
Once Municipal footballers